Gunnar Bjørn Reichenwald Norbye, often misspelled spelled Nordbye, (1897–1940) was a Norwegian lawyer and politician.  He served as the County Governor of Troms county from 1938 until his unexpected death in 1940. He had been on board the ship DS Richard With which was attacked in May 1940 and the ship was evacuated and the passengers safely landed on shore.  Shortly afterwards, Norbye got sick and died.

References

1897 births
1940 deaths
County governors of Norway